Kato Polemidia is a municipality of Cyprus, located in the district of Limassol. It has a population of 22,369 according to the 2011 census.

History 
The area of Kato Polemidia has been inhabited since prehistoric times. Archaeological excavations have uncovered a Late Bronze Age necropolis, as well as archaeological remains from prehistoric times at sites called Skammata and Ufkia. In medieval sources the village is referred to as Polemidia, without dividing into Lower and Upper Polemidia.

In 1986 Kato Polemidia was declared a municipality.

.

Sub-divisions areas 
The Municipality of Kato Polemidia, for administrative purposes, is divided into 6 districts:

 Archangel Michael
 Anthoupolis
 Apostle Barnabas
 Makarios C.
 Saint Nicholas
 Panagia Evangelistria

Public Health Institutions 
In Kato Polemidia is situated the New State Hospital of Limassol

Sport Clubs 
Sports clubs in the area are Doxa Polemidion and Hermes Polemidion.

Demographics
In 1960 Census, there were 1286 Greek Cypriots and 982 Turkish Cypriots in Kato Polemidia.

During the years of Cypriot intercommunal violence and after the collapse of the bicommunal structure of the Republic of Cyprus, Richard Patrick wrote that the village, along with Pano Polemidia, were exceptional in that they remained accessible to the Greek Cypriot population and the Greek Cypriot National Guard. The National Guard co-existed with the fighters of the Turkish Resistance Organization, which were open with regards to their existence, but were tolerated by the National Guard so long as they did not carry weaponry. In 1974, following the ultra-nationalist Greek coup and the Turkish invasion of Cyprus, the population of the village fled to the Akrotiri British Base. Some of the population then fled secretly to Northern Cyprus, but most were transferred in 1975 and resettled in Morphou. The village was repopulated by displaced Greek Cypriots from the north, who initially filled up the homes of Turkish Cypriots. As more refugees came in, they were allocated self-housing schemes in the village.

Sports
The Turkish Cypriot football club Binatlı Yılmaz S.K., now based in Morphou, was founded in 1940. As of 2015, the club is playing in Cyprus Turkish Football Association (CTFA) K-PET 1st League.

References

Municipalities in Limassol District